Los Angeles Wildcats is a name shared by several American football teams from Los Angeles:

Los Angeles Wildcats (AFL), a team that played in the American Football League of 1926
Los Angeles Wildcats (Minor League AFL), a team that played in the American Football League of 1944
Los Angeles Wildcats (XFL), an XFL team that began play in 2020